Bibliography of the Armenian genocide is a list of books about the Armenian genocide:

Historical overviews 
 Akçam, Taner. A Shameful Act: The Armenian Genocide and the Question of Turkish Responsibility. New York: Metropolitan Books, 2007.
  –  
 Balakian, Peter. The Burning Tigris: The Armenian Genocide and America's Response. New York: HarperCollins, 2003. 
 Bloxham, Donald. The Great Game of Genocide: Imperialism, Nationalism, and the Destruction of the Ottoman Armenians. Oxford: Oxford University Press, 2005. 
 
 Dadrian, Vahakn. Warrant for Genocide: Key Elements of Turko-Armenian Conflict. New Brunswick, New Jersey: Transaction Publishers, 2003. 
 
 Kévorkian, Raymond. The Armenian Genocide: A Complete History. London: I.B. Tauris, 2011. 
 Suny, Ronald Grigor. "They Can Live in the Desert but Nowhere Else": A History of the Armenian Genocide. Princeton, NJ: Princeton University Press, 2015.

Specific issues and comparative studies 
 
 
 Bobelian, Michael.  Children of Armenia: A Forgotten Genocide and the Century-Long Struggle for Justice. New York: Simon & Schuster, 2009.
 Dadrian, Vahakn. "Genocide as a Problem of National and International Law: The World War I Armenian Case and its Contemporary Legal Ramifications", Yale Journal of International Law, Volume 14, Number 2, 1989.
 Dadrian, Vahakn. "Patterns of Twentieth Century Genocides: the Armenian, Jewish, and Rwandan Cases". Journal of Genocide Research, 2004, 6 (4), pp. 487–522.
 Göçek, Fatma Müge. Denial of Violence: Ottoman Past, Turkish Present, and Collective Violence against the Armenians, 1789–2009. Oxford: Oxford University Press, 2014.
 Hovannisian, Richard (ed.) The Armenian Genocide: History, Politics, Ethics. New York: St. Martin's Press, 1992.
 Hovannisian, Richard. Remembrance and Denial: The Case of the Armenian Genocide. Detroit: Wayne State University Press, 1998.
 Hovannisian, Richard. The Armenian Genocide: Cultural and Ethical Legacies. New Brunswick, NJ: Transaction Publishers, 2007.
 Hovannisian, Richard G. and Simon Payalsian (eds). Armenian Cilicia. Costa Mesa, California: Mazda Publishers, 2008.
 Mann, Michael. The Dark Side of Democracy: Explaining Ethnic Cleansing. Cambridge, UK: Cambridge, UP, 2004.
 Melson, Robert, Revolution and Genocide: On the Origins of the Armenian Genocide and the Holocaust. Chicago: University of Chicago Press, 1996.
 Power, Samantha. "A Problem from Hell": America and the Age of Genocide. New York: Harper Perennial 2003.
 
 .
 Michelle Tusan, "Crimes against Humanity": Human Rights, the British Empire, and the Origins of the Response to the Armenian Genocide, American Hist. Rev. 119(1), 2014,  pp 47–77

Survivors' testimonies and memory 

 Balakian, Grigoris. Armenian Golgotha. Translated by Peter Balakian with Aris Sevag. New York: Alfred A. Knopf, 2009.
 Bedoukian, Kerop. Some of Us Survived: The Story of an Armenian Boy. New York: Farrar Straus Giroux, 1978.
 Hartunian, Abraham H. Neither to Laugh nor to Weep: A Memoir of the Armenian Genocide. Translated by Vartan Hartunian. Cambridge, MA: Armenian Heritage Press, 1986.
 Jacobsen, Maria. Diaries of a Danish missionary: Harpoot, 1907–1919. Princeton: Gomidas Institute, 2001.
 Lang, David Marshall. The Armenians: A People in Exile. London: Allen & Unwin, 1981.
 Miller, Donald E. and Lorna Touryan Miller. Survivors: An Oral History of the Armenian Genocide. Berkeley: University of California Press, 1993.
 Panian, Karnig. Goodbye, Antoura: A Memoir of the Armenian Genocide. Stanford, CA: Stanford University Press, 2015.
 Odian, Yervant. Accursed Years: My Exile and Return from Der Zor, 1914–1919. Translated by Ara Stepan Melkonyan. London: Taderon Press, 2009.
 Svazlyan, Verzhine. The Armenian Genocide and Historical Memory. Translated by Tigran Tsulikian. Yerevan: Gitutiun Publishing House, 2004.

Regional studies

Former Armenian communities 
 Hovannisian, Richard. Armenian Van/Vaspurakan. Costa Mesa, California: Mazda Publishers, 2000.
 Hovannisian, Richard. Armenian Baghesh/Bitlis and Taron/Mush. Costa Mesa, California: Mazda Publishers, 2001.
 Hovannisian, Richard. Armenian Karin/Erzerum. Costa Mesa, California: Mazda Publishers, 2003.
 Hovannisian, Richard. Armenian Sebastia/Sivas and Lesser Armenia. Costa Mesa, California: Mazda Publishers, 2004.

World responses and foreign testimony 
 Anderson, Margaret Lavinia. "'Down in Turkey, far away': Human Rights, the Armenian Massacres, and Orientalism in Wilhelmine Germany", Journal of Modern History Volume, 79, Number 1, March 2007, pp. 80–111. in JSTOR
 Barton, James L. Turkish Atrocities: Statements of American Missionaries on the Destruction of Christian Communities in Ottoman Turkey, 1915–1917. Ann Arbor: Gomidas Institute, 1997.
 
 Dadrian, Vahakn N. Documentation of the Armenian Genocide in Turkish Sources. Jerusalem: Institute on the Holocaust and Genocide, 1991.
 Davis, Leslie A. The Slaughterhouse Province: An American Diplomat's Report on the Armenian Genocide, 1915–1917. ew Rochelle, N.Y.: A.D. Caratzas, 1989.
 Fitzpatrick, Matthew P.  "‘Ideal and Ornamental Endeavours’: The Armenian Reforms and Germany's Response to Britain's Imperial Humanitarianism in the Ottoman Empire, 1878–83." Journal of Imperial and Commonwealth History 40.2 (2012): 183-206.
 Hovannisian, Richard G. "The Allies and Armenia, 1915–18". Journal of Contemporary History 1968 3(1): 145–68.  Fulltext: in Jstor
 Laderman, Charlie.  Sharing the Burden: The Armenian Question, Humanitarian Intervention, and Anglo-American Visions of Global Order (Oxford University Press, 2019).
 Libaridian, Gerard. "The Ideology of the Young Turk Movement", pp. 37–49. In Gerard Libaridian (Ed.) A Crime of Silence, The Armenian Genocide: Permanent Peoples' Tribunal. London: Zed Books, 1985.
 .
 .
 .
 .
 .

Memory and historiography 
 
 .
 .
 
 Fatma Müge Göçek and Donald Bloxham. "The Armenian Genocide" in The Historiography of Genocide. Dan Stone, ed. London: Palgrave Macmillan. 2008, pp. 344–72. online
 Gutman, David. "Ottoman Historiography and the End of the Genocide Taboo: Writing the Armenian Genocide into Late Ottoman History." Journal of the Ottoman and Turkish Studies Association 2:1 (2015) pp. 167–83. online
 , 316 pp.
 Khatchadourian, Raffi. "Letter from Turkey. A Century of Silence." The New Yorker, 5 January 2015, pp. 32–53.
 
 
 .
 .
 .
 Quataert, Donald, "The Massacres of Ottoman Armenians and the Writing of Ottoman History," Journal of Interdisciplinary History 37:2 (2006): 249–59. online

Genocide denial
 The Banality of Denial, by Yair Auron, Rutgers University Press, New Brunswick, 2003, 338 p.
 Investigation into the negation of a genocide, by Yves Ternon, Brackets, 1989
 Revolution and Genocide, by Robert Melson, 1992, 386 p.
 Armenia: The Survival of a Nation, by Christopher J. Walker. Revised Second Edition. New York, NY: St. Martin's Press, 1990. 476 p.
 Remembrance and Denial: The Case of the Armenian Genocide, by Richard G. Hovannisian, 1998
 Dadrian, Vahakn. Key Elements in the Turkish Denial of the Armenian Genocide. Toronto: Zoryan Institute, 1999.
 The Psychological Satisfaction of Denials of the Holocaust or Other Genocides by Non-Extremists or Bigots, and Even by Known Scholars, by Israel W. Charny, "IDEA" journal, 17 July 2001, Vol. 6, no. 1
 Professional ethics and the denial of the Armenian genocide, by Smith, Roger W.; Markusen, Eric; and Lifton, Robert Jay // Holocaust and Genocide Studies, # 9 (1), 1995, pp. 1–22
 "The long denied Armenian Genocide: Turkey's carefully forgotten history," by Taner Akçam, Le Monde Diplomatique, 2000
 U.S. Denial of the Armenian Genocide, by Stephen Zunes, "Foreign Policy in Focus", 22 October 2007
  - Published 11 October 2012
  – Posted at the University of Southern California (USC)

Documentaries
 
 

Non-fiction books about the Armenian genocide
Armenian genocide